Priyanka Dutt Chalasani (born 19 December 1984) is an Indian film producer known for her work in Telugu cinema. She is the daughter of C. Ashwini Dutt, a well known Indian film producer and the founder of Vyjayanthi Movies. Dutt studied film making from University of California, Los Angeles.  She made her debut as a filmmaker at the age of 20 by co-producing the film Balu in 2004. She is the founder of Three Angels Studio, and has produced a short film titled; Yaadon Ki Baraat which was screened at the 2013 Cannes Film Festival.

Early days 
Dutt began her career in the film industry by assisting the Bombay based director and admaker Shoojit Sircar in many of his ad films for various brands. She moved to Hyderabad to co-produce movies with her father's banner Vyjayanthi Movies. She co-produced three films: Balu (2005), Jai Chiranjeeva (2005), and Shakti (2011).

Three Angels Studio 
Dutt launched her own production house, Three Angels Studio in the year 2009 to encourage New age cinema. The studio produced its first film Baanam (2009) which explores the story of an IPS officer who is the son of a Naxalite. The film was critically acclaimed for the way it dealt with the issue. The film won Priyanka the Silver Nandi Award in the best film category in 2009. She also produced corporate films for premium clients in India under Three Angels Studio.

Filmography

References

External links 
 

1984 births
Living people
Indian women film producers
UCLA Film School alumni
Nandi Award winners
Businesspeople from Vijayawada
Film producers from Andhra Pradesh
21st-century Indian businesspeople
Businesswomen from Andhra Pradesh
21st-century Indian businesswomen